Taghi Zohouri  (– February 28, 1992) was an Iranian actor and comedian.

Life 
Taghi Zohouri was a graduate of the first course of the Pre-Art Academy. He has been working in Tehran theaters since 1936.

References 

1913 births
1992 deaths
People from Tehran
Iranian male film actors
Iranian male stage actors
Iranian male voice actors
Burials at Emamzadeh Taher